The Eight Views of Taiwan have been variously defined throughout Taiwan's history.

Qing Dynasty

Under Japanese occupation
In 1927 (during the Japanese occupation of Taiwan), the newspaper  elected the Eight Views of Taiwan according to its readers' votes as:
Rising Sun Hill (旭岡), now Sun Yat-sen Park, Keelung 
Tamsui
Eight Immortals Mountain
Sun Moon Lake
Alishan
Monkey Mountain
Cape Eluanbi
Taroko

Republic of China
After the retrocession of Taiwan to the Republic of China, the Taiwan Provincial Government defined the Eight Views of Taiwan in 1953 as follows:
Sun Moon Lake
Yushan
Fort Zeelandia
Alishan
Yangmingshan
Taroko
Qingshui Cliff
Penghu Islands

In 2005, an updated version of the Eight Views of Taiwan was published by the ROC Ministry of Transportation and Communications:
Taipei 101
National Palace Museum
Sun Moon Lake
Alishan
Yushan
Kaohsiung Love River
Kenting
Taroko

References

See also
 Eight Views in China, Japan and Korea
 Eight Views of Xiaoxiang
 Eight Views of Jinzhou (Dalian)
 Eight Views of Lushun South Road, Dalian
 Eight Views of Omi, Japan
 Eight Views of Korea
 Thirty-six Views of Mount Fuji, by Hokusai and Hiroshige

Geography of Taiwan
Taiwanese culture